The 2022 Italian by-elections were held to replace members of the Italian Parliament. The first election was held on 16 January 2022.

List

Chamber of Deputies

Lazio 1: Rome, Trionfale 

The by-election in the constituency of Trionfale (Rome) was held on 16 January 2022 to replace Roberto Gualtieri  (Democratic Party). He was elected as the new Mayor of Rome in the 2021 Rome municipal election, and thus resigned from the Chamber of Deputies on 4 November 2021.

Democratic Party Secretary Enrico Letta proposed to the former Prime Minister Giuseppe Conte to run for the by-election, but his candidacy was strongly opposed by Carlo Calenda, which ran in the 2021 Rome municipal election and got the first place in 1st Municipio. Calenda stated that he would run against Conte if he decided to run as well. Ultimately, Conte declined the proposal stating that he was too busy with the reorganization of the Five Star Movement. The turnout was extremely low, with only 11.33% of the population turning out to vote, 7% less than at the 2020 by-election.

References

See also 
 By-elections in Italy

By-elections in Italy
2022 elections in Italy
January 2022 events in Italy